Trystan Stuart Gwyn Magnuson (born June 6, 1985) is a Canadian former professional baseball pitcher. He played in Major League Baseball (MLB) for the Oakland Athletics.

Career
He was originally drafted by the Toronto Blue Jays with the 56th pick in the 2007 MLB draft from the University of Louisville. He played in the minor leagues with the Blue Jays until being traded to the Oakland Athletics along with Daniel Farquhar for Rajai Davis after the 2010 season. Magnuson made his major league debut on May 17, 2011, against the Los Angeles Angels of Anaheim. He threw 1 inning and didn't give up a run. He was traded back to Toronto for cash considerations on November 4, 2011.

Magnuson started the 2013 season with the Blue Jays' Double-A affiliate New Hampshire Fisher Cats. He was released on May 7, 2013.

Personal life
He is the nephew of the late National Hockey League defenseman Keith Magnuson.

Magnuson graduated with his Master's in Engineering from Carnegie Mellon University in 2014 and now works as a mechanical engineer in the automotive industry.

References

External links

1985 births
Living people
Baseball people from British Columbia
Canadian expatriate baseball players in the United States
Dunedin Blue Jays players
Lansing Lugnuts players
Louisville Cardinals baseball players
Major League Baseball pitchers
Major League Baseball players from Canada
New Hampshire Fisher Cats players
Oakland Athletics players
Sacramento River Cats players
Sportspeople from Vancouver
World Baseball Classic players of Canada
2013 World Baseball Classic players